Aftermath is the soundtrack for Mark Jackson's film War Story, performed by Amy Lee. It was released on August 25, 2014.

Background
Lee announced the film score project on her Twitter account in December 2013. In a January 2014 interview with MTV News, she said the new material would "surprise" her fans, explaining that "It's not what you'd expect; ... There's a lot of blending of sounds, a lot of ominous tones. I play a lot of keyboard, and a lot of Taurus pedal. There's a lot of low drones."

Critical reception

George Garner of Kerrang! praised Lee's efforts for edging away from the heaviness of Evanescence. He described the album as containing all minimalist pianos and eerie strings, and that it was the best representation of Lee's voice and talent to date.

Track listing

Credits and personnel
Credits are taken from War Story's film credits and the album's liner notes.

Thad DeBrock - performer
Pete Doell - mastering
Dave Eggar – cello, producer, mixing
Joel Hoekstra – guitar
Ramona Lawla - performer
Amy Lee – vocals, keyboards, programming, producer, mixing
Dan Mandell - art direction, designer
Kenia Mattis - performer
Brendan Muldowney – mixing
Dave Nelson - performer
Johnny Nice - performer, producer
Luke Notary - performer
Chuck Palmer – drums, programming, producer, mixing
Donnie Reis - performer
Amanda Ruzza – bass
Brandon Terzig - performer
Malika Zarra - vocals
Max ZT - performer

Charts

References 

2014 soundtrack albums
Amy Lee albums
Self-released albums
Drama film soundtracks